Ewald Tilker (3 November 1911 – 8 September 1998) was a German canoeist who competed in the 1936 Summer Olympics. He won the silver medal in the K-2 1000 m event with Fritz Bondroit.

References
Ewald Tilker's profile at databaseOlympics
Ewald Tilker's profile at Sports Reference.com

1911 births
1998 deaths
Canoeists at the 1936 Summer Olympics
German male canoeists
Olympic canoeists of Germany
Olympic silver medalists for Germany
Olympic medalists in canoeing
Medalists at the 1936 Summer Olympics